Qaysān may refer to:
Qaysān, Abdullah Qeissan, Sudan
Qaysān, Qēssan, Sudan